Uptown Records is an American record label, based in New York City, founded in 1986 by onetime rapper Andre Harrell. From the late 1980s into the early 1990s, it was a leader in R&B and hip hop. During the 1990s, aided by its A&R worker Sean Combs, it led the fusion of these two genres. Its artists included Al B. Sure!, Christopher Williams, Guy, Heavy D & The Boyz, Father MC, Jodeci, Mary J. Blige, Notorious B.I.G., and Soul for Real.

Growth
In 1986, Andre Harrell, half of rap duo Dr. Jeckyll and Mr. Hyde, founded Uptown Records. Its compilation album Uptown Is Kickin' It, including artists Heavy D & The Boyz as well as Marley Marl, was distributed by MCA Records. The acts who recorded on that album were collectively known as The Uptown Crew. The Heavy D & The Boyz album Living Large, certified Gold, followed in 1987. The Al B. Sure! album In Effect Mode, released in 1988, distributed by Warner Bros under Warner Music, place seven songs on the R&B chart.

Also of 1988 were the Gyrlz album Love Me or Leave Me, distributed by Capitol, and the eponymous album of Guy, a group whose Teddy Riley, a record producer, would lead the sound "new jack swing". The Guy album reached No. 1 on the R&B chart. Guy's second album, The Future, arrived in 1990. Heavy D & The Boyz' second album, 1989's Big Tyme, preceded his album Peaceful Journey, honoring Boyz member Trouble T Roy, killed by accidental fall on tour.

By 1990, 20-year-old Sean "Puffy" Combs began an internship at Uptown. Combs worked with newly signed acts Jodeci, Father MC, and Mary J. Blige, who altogether placed a number of singles on the R&B chart. Marking a fusion of hip hop and R&B was Mary J. Blige's debut album What's the 411?, released in July 1992, whereby she was dubbed the Queen of Hip Hop Soul. Led by her single "You Remind Me", it was certified three times platinum, honoring three million copies sold.

In 1991, Harrell was executive producer of the comedy film Strictly Business, starring Tommy Davidson and Halle Berry, as well as its soundtrack. The following year, Harrell and MCA reached a multimedia deal that eventuated in development of FOX's hit television series New York Undercover—a police drama originally named Uptown Undercover—which aired from 1994 to 1998. The record label itself was renamed Uptown Enterprises. By 1993, it was the leading urban label.

In February 1993, the MTV Unplugged live, acoustic series featured Jodeci, Father MC, Mary J. Blige, Christopher Williams, and Heavy D, resulting in release of Uptown Unplugged as both album and home video. A resulting single, Jodeci's live cover of Stevie Wonder's "Lately" peaked at #1 on the R&B chart and #4 on the pop singles chart, the Billboard Hot 100. Later in 1993, Uptown released the soundtrack to the hip-hop film Who's the Man?. Closing 1993, Uptown released Jodeci's second album, Diary of a Mad Band.

Decline
In July 1993, amid issues with Harrell, Uptown fired Combs. Within two weeks, he launched his own label, Bad Boy, while taking with him The Notorious B.I.G. Uptown promptly suffered, yet Combs still executive produced Mary J. Blige's second album, My Life, released at December 1994, soon certified 3x Multi-Platinum in the U.S.

Increasingly dissatisfied, Mary J. Blige and Jodeci both signed to West Coast Management, the firm of Suge Knight, CEO of Death Row, based in Los Angeles. Thus, they gained double the royalty rates, more creative control, and sizable back payments. Meanwhile, the final Heavy D & The Boyz album, Nuttin' But Love, was released in 1994, and soon certified Platinum in the U.S.

In 1995, Uptown's new R&B group Soul for Real's debut album Candy Rain was released, as was Jodeci's third and final studio album for Uptown Records, The Show, the After Party, the Hotel. Later in 1995, Harrell left Uptown to become CEO of Motown Records, while Heavy D, executive vice president of Uptown, became Uptown's president and CEO. Prominent acts like Mary J. Blige and Jodeci signed directly to Uptown's distribution label, MCA.

By 1996, MCA along with Universal Studios, the filmmaking house, was bought by the owners of Seagram's, and became Universal Music Group. In 1997, Heavy D resigned as CEO of Uptown, absorbed into Universal Music during 1999. In December 2019, television network BET announced production of a miniseries on the history of Uptown Records.

Present day
As of 1999, the label was thought to be defunct. However in 2022, Ciara announced that she had signed a deal with Uptown Records via Republic Records, which would see the label assist in distributing her eight studio album.

Current artists
Ciara (distribution/partnership deal with Republic)

Coi Leray (Uptown/Republic)

Flo (Island/Uptown/Republic)

Former artists

References

External links
 Uptown Records  at Discogs
 Uptown Records and Andre Harrell  at NJS4E 

American record labels
Record labels established in 1986
Contemporary R&B record labels
Hip hop record labels
MCA Records
Republic Records
1986 establishments in New York City